Madison Township is an inactive township in Clark County, in the U.S. state of Missouri.

Madison Township has the name of President James Madison.

References

Townships in Missouri
Townships in Clark County, Missouri